The Australian Industry & Defence Network Inc. (AIDN) is the industry association for small and medium enterprises (SMEs) doing business in the defence and security sectors in Australia and abroad.

See also
Defence industry of Victoria

References

External links
https://web.archive.org/web/20110205084300/http://www.aidn.org.au/
http://www.defence.gov.au/

Business organisations based in Australia
Defence companies of Australia